The 1884 Wellington City mayoral election was part of the New Zealand local elections held that same year to decide who would take the office of Mayor of Wellington.

Background
Incumbent mayor George Fisher sought re-election for a fourth term and was successful, seeing off challenges from councillor James Petherick Jr. and former mayor George Allen. There was a large amount of protest votes cast against Fisher with many voters thinking he had been mayor for long enough as well as taking exception to him reneging on a pledge at the previous election that he would not stand again. As such, while Fisher was re-elected, his large majorities from previous elections was cut dramatically.

Election results
The following table gives the election results:

Notes

References

Mayoral elections in Wellington
1884 elections in New Zealand
Politics of the Wellington Region
1880s in Wellington
November 1884 events